The Angola women's national basketball team Under-18 represents Angola in international basketball matches and is controlled by the Federação Angolana de Basquetebol. At continental level, it competes at the FIBA Africa Under-18 Championship for Women which is eligible for the FIBA Under-19 World Championship for Women. Angola has been a member of FIBA since 1979.

Current roster

Head coach positions
 Aníbal Moreira 2018
 Apolinário Paquete 2017
 Elisa Pires 2016
 Jaime Covilhã 2014
 Fernando Sapalo 2012
 Apolinário Paquete 2000

World Championship record
 1985 – 2017: Not Qualified

Africa Championship record
 Antsirabe 2022 : 
 Maputo 2018 : 
 Cairo 2016 : 4th
 Cairo 2014 : 5th
 Dakar 2012 : 5th
 Cairo 2010 : 7th
 Radès 2008 : 10th
 Cotonou 2006 : 5th
 Tunis 2004 : 4th
 Bamako 2000 : 
 Dakar 1998 : 
 Dakar 1991 : 
 Luanda 1988 : 
 Accra 1985 :

Players

2012–2018
A = African championship

2002–2010
AC = African championship;WC = World cup

See also
 Angola women's national basketball team
 Angola women's national basketball team Under-20
 Angola women's national basketball team Under-16
 Angola women's junior handball team

References

External links
 2006 Team profile at FIBA.com
 2004 Team profile at FIBA.com

Women's national under-18 basketball teams
Women's national under-19 basketball teams
under